Actias witti is a moth in the family Saturniidae. It is found in India (Andaman Islands).

References

Witti
Moths described in 2007
Moths of Asia